Lix1 homolog (mouse)-like also known as LIX1L is a protein which in humans is encoded by the LIX1L  gene.

Related gene problems
TAR syndrome
1q21.1 deletion syndrome
1q21.1 duplication syndrome

References